Arthur Reginald Fisher (15 June 1901 – 29 December 1958) was an Australian politician.

He was born in Oatlands, Tasmania. In 1956 he was elected to the Tasmanian House of Assembly as a Labor member for Wilmot. He served until his death in 1958.

References

1901 births
1958 deaths
Members of the Tasmanian House of Assembly
Australian Labor Party members of the Parliament of Tasmania
20th-century Australian politicians